Louise Anne de Bourbon, Mademoiselle de Charolais (23 June 1695 – 8 April 1758) was a French princess, the daughter of Louis III de Bourbon, Prince of Condé. Her father was the grandson of le Grand Condé, while her mother, Louise Françoise de Bourbon, was the eldest surviving legitimised daughter of Louis XIV of France and his maîtresse-en-titre, Madame de Montespan.

Biography

Early life
Born at the Palace of Versailles, Louise Anne was the fourth child and third daughter of her parents. Her eldest sisters were Marie Anne Gabrielle Éléonore de Bourbon and Louise Élisabeth de Bourbon. She was baptised in the chapel of Versailles on 24 November 1698 with her brother Louis Henri and her sister Louise Élisabeth.

Louise Anne's father died in 1710, eleven months after having inherited the title of Prince de Condé at the death of his own father. Since her first cousin, Louis d'Orléans, never had a daughter who survived into adulthood, Louise Anne became known at court by the style of Mademoiselle, which she held from 1728 when Louis' daughter, Louise Marie d'Orléans, died at the age of one.

During the Regency

During the Régence of her cousin, Philippe II, Duke of Orléans, she became romantically involved with the Duke of Richelieu, a grandnephew of Cardinal Richelieu. At the same time, the Duke of Richelieu also began an affair with Louise Anne's first cousin, Charlotte Aglaé d'Orléans, known at court as Mademoiselle de Valois. The two cousins, rivals in love, would later both fight fiercely, but separately, for the liberation of the duke from his incarceration in the Bastille due to his participation in the Cellamare Conspiracy.

Louise Anne never married. At one time, she was considered as a possible bride for her cousin, Louis Auguste, Prince of Dombes, but she refused.  Another proposed husband was the Duke of Chartres, the son of the Regent, and heir to the House of Orléans. His mother, however, wanted a more prestigious marriage for her son with a young German princess.

Voltaire, a friend of Richelieu, wrote the following verse concerning Louise-Anne:

Frère ange de Charolois
Dis-nous par quelle aventure
Le cordon de Saint François
Sert à Vénus de ceinture.

Reign of Louis XV

As the years passed, Louise Anne constantly intrigued for political prominence. She would later help her cousin Louis XV in his search for new mistresses. It was common gossip at the time that Louise Anne was actually one of the king's former mistresses; that she was his first unofficial sexual partner after his wife, possibly as early as the late 1720s, and that they had an on-and-off-affair for a few years and that she introduced him to prospective new mistresses. However, other contemporaries claim that while Louise Anne did wish to become his lover and did attempt to seduce him, she never actually succeeded to become his mistress. The king did, in any case, enjoy her company, and she belonged to his circle of personal friends and frequently attended court. Louise Anne's older sister, Louise Élisabeth, introduced Madame de Pompadour to the French court in the 1740s.

Louise Anne owned several estates. In 1735, she became the owner of the Hôtel de Rothelin-Charolais in Paris, which became her townhouse.    She would later sell the lands at Vallery, in the Bourgogne province of France, which had been the traditional burial place of her Condé ancestors.    She also owned various châteaux such as the one at Athis outside Paris. She later sold the estate of Charolais to the Crown and in return got land in Palaiseau, which further augmented her personal real estate holdings.

Louise Anne died in Paris, at the Hôtel de Rothelin-Charolais, at the age of sixty-two. She was buried in the Carmelite Convent of the Faubourg Saint-Jacques. Her brother, Louis Henri, Duke of Bourbon, and her two sisters, Marie Anne de Bourbon and Élisabeth Alexandrine de Bourbon, were also buried there.

Ancestry

References

Louise Anne
Louise Anne
17th-century French women
18th-century French women
1695 births
1758 deaths
Mistresses of Louis XV
Burials at the Carmel du faubourg Saint-Jacques
Louise Anne
Charloais, Countess of, Louise Anne de Bourbon